The continuous stirred-tank reactor (CSTR), also known as vat- or backmix reactor, mixed flow reactor (MFR), or a continuous-flow stirred-tank reactor (CFSTR), is a common model for a chemical reactor in chemical engineering and environmental engineering. A CSTR often refers to a model used to estimate the key unit operation variables when using a continuous agitated-tank reactor to reach a specified output. The mathematical model works for all fluids: liquids, gases, and slurries.

The behavior of a CSTR is often approximated or modeled by that of an ideal CSTR, which assumes perfect mixing. In a perfectly mixed reactor, reagent is instantaneously and uniformly mixed throughout the reactor upon entry. Consequently, the output composition is identical to composition of the material inside the reactor, which is a function of residence time and reaction rate. The CSTR is the ideal limit of complete mixing in reactor design, which is the complete opposite of a plug flow reactor (PFR). In practice, no reactors behave ideally but instead fall somewhere in between the mixing limits of an ideal CSTR and PFR.

Ideal CSTR

Modeling 
A continuous fluid flow containing non-conservative chemical reactant A enters an ideal CSTR of volume V.

Assumptions:

 perfect or ideal mixing
 steady state , where NA is the number of moles of species A
 closed boundaries
 constant fluid density (valid for most liquids; valid for gases only if there is no net change in the number of moles or drastic temperature change)
 nth-order reaction (r = kCAn), where k is the reaction rate constant, CA is the concentration of species A, and n is the order of the reaction
 isothermal conditions, or constant temperature (k is constant)
 single, irreversible reaction (νA = −1)
 All reactant A is converted to products via chemical reaction
 NA = CA V

Integral mass balance on number of moles NA of species A in a reactor of volume V:

where,

 FAo is the molar flow rate inlet of species A
 FA is the molar flow rate outlet of species A
 vA is the stoichiometric coefficient
 rA is the reaction rate

Applying the assumptions of steady state and νA = −1, Equation 2 simplifies to:

The molar flow rates of species A can then be rewritten in terms of the concentration of A and the fluid flow rate (Q):

Equation 4 can then be rearranged to isolate rA and simplified:

where,

  is the theoretical residence time
 CAo is the inlet concentration of species A
 CA is the reactor/outlet concentration of species A

Residence time is the total amount of time a discrete quantity of reagent spends inside the reactor. For an ideal reactor, the theoretical residence time, is always equal to the reactor volume divided by the fluid flow rate. See the next section for a more in-depth discussion on the residence time distribution of a CSTR.

Depending on the order of the reaction, the reaction rate, rA, is generally dependent on the concentration of species A in the reactor and the rate constant. A key assumption when modeling a CSTR is that any reactant in the fluid is perfectly (i.e. uniformly) mixed in the reactor, implying that the concentration within the reactor is the same in the outlet stream. The rate constant can be determined using a known empirical reaction rate that is adjusted for temperature using the Arrhenius temperature dependence. Generally, as the temperature increases so does the rate at which the reaction occurs.

Equation 6 can be solved by integration after substituting the proper rate expression. The table below summarizes the outlet concentration of species A for an ideal CSTR. The values of the outlet concentration and residence time are major design criteria in the design of CSTRs for industrial applications.

Residence time distribution 
An ideal CSTR will exhibit well-defined flow behavior that can be characterized by the reactor's residence time distribution, or exit age distribution. Not all fluid particles will spend the same amount of time within the reactor. The exit age distribution (E(t)) defines the probability that a given fluid particle will spend time t in the reactor. Similarly, the cumulative age distribution (F(t)) gives the probability that a given fluid particle has an exit age less than time t. One of the key takeaways from the exit age distribution is that a very small number of fluid particles will never exit the CSTR. Depending on the application of the reactor, this may either be an asset or a drawback.

Non-ideal CSTR 
While the ideal CSTR model is useful for predicting the fate of constituents during a chemical or biological process, CSTRs rarely exhibit ideal behavior in reality. More commonly, the reactor hydraulics do not behave ideally or the system conditions do not obey the initial assumptions. Perfect mixing is a theoretical concept that is not achievable in practice. For engineering purposes, however, if the residence time is 5–10 times the mixing time, the perfect mixing assumption generally holds true.

Non-ideal hydraulic behavior is commonly classified by either dead space or short-circuiting. These phenomena occur when some fluid spends less time in the reactor than the theoretical residence time, . The presence of corners or baffles in a reactor often results in some dead space where the fluid is poorly mixed. Similarly, a jet of fluid in the reactor can cause short-circuiting, in which a portion of the flow exits the reactor much quicker than the bulk fluid. If dead space or short-circuiting occur in a CSTR, the relevant chemical or biological reactions may not finish before the fluid exits the reactor. Any deviation from ideal flow will result in a residence time distribution different from the ideal distribution, as seen at right.

Modeling non-ideal flow 
Although ideal flow reactors are seldom found in practice, they are useful tools for modeling non-ideal flow reactors. Any flow regime can be achieved by modeling a reactor as a combination of ideal CSTRs and plug flow reactors (PFRs) either in series or in parallel. For examples, an infinite series of ideal CSTRs is hydraulically equivalent to an ideal PFR. Reactor models combining a number of CSTRs in series are often termed tanks-in-series (TIS) models.

To model systems that do not obey the assumptions of constant temperature and a single reaction, additional dependent variables must be considered. If the system is considered to be in unsteady-state, a differential equation or a system of coupled differential equations must be solved. Deviations of the CSTR behavior can be considered by the dispersion model. CSTRs are known to be one of the systems which exhibit complex behavior such as steady-state multiplicity, limit cycles, and chaos.

Cascades of CSTRs

Cascades of CSTRs, also known as a series of CSTRs, are used to decrease the volume of a system.

Minimizing Volume

When the same process is applied to a cascade of CSTRs as seen in the graph with three CSTRs, the volume of each reactor is calculated from each inlet and outlet fractional conversion, therefore resulting in a decrease in total reactor volume. Optimum size is achieved when the area above the rectangles from the CSTRs in series that was previously covered by a single CSTR is maximized. For a first order reaction with two CSTRs, equal volumes should be used. As the number of ideal CSTRs (n) approaches infinity, the total reactor volume approaches that of an ideal PFR for the same reaction and fractional conversion.

Ideal Cascade of CSTRs
From the design equation of a single CSTR where , we can determine that for a single CSTR in series that 

First order
For an isothermal first order, constant density reaction in a cascade of identical CSTRs operating at steady state

For one CSTR:

Two CSTRs:
 and 

Plugging in the first CSTR equation to the second:

Therefore for m identical CSTRs in series:

When the volumes of the individual CSTRs in series vary, the order of the CSTRs does not change the overall conversion for a first order reaction as long as the CSTRs are run at the same temperature.

Zeroth order
At steady state, the general equation for an isothermal zeroth order reaction at in a cascade of CSTRs is given by 

When the cascade of CSTRs is isothermal with identical reactors, the concentration is given by

Second order
For an isothermal second order reaction at steady state in a cascade of CSTRs, the general design equation is

Non-ideal cascade of CSTRs
With non-ideal reactors, residence time distributions can be calculated. At the concentration at the jth reactor in series is given by

From this, the cumulative residence time distribution (F(t)) can be calculated as

As n → ∞, F(t) approaches the ideal PFR response.

Cost

When determining the cost of a series of CSTRs, capital and operating costs must be taken into account. As seen above, an increase in the number of CSTRs in series will decrease the total reactor volume. Since cost scales with volume, capital costs are lowered by increasing the number of CSTRs. The largest decrease in cost, and therefore volume, occurs between a single CSTR and having two CSTRs in series. When considering operating cost, operating cost scales with the number of pumps and controls, construction, installation, and maintenance that accompany larger cascades. Therefore as the number of CSTRs increases, the operating cost increases. Therefore, there is a minimum cost associated with a cascade of CSTRs.

Zeroth order reactions
Therefore the total reactor volume is independent of the number of CSTRs for a zeroth order reaction. Therefore, cost is not a function of the number of reactors for a zeroth order reaction and does not decrease as the number of CSTRs increases.

Selectivity of parallel reactions
When considering parallel reactions, utilizing a cascade of CSTRs can achieve greater selectivity for a desired product.

Therefore . In the case where  and B is the desired product, the cascade of CSTRs is favored with a fresh secondary feed of  A  in order to maximize the concentration of  A .

Therefore .

Series reactions such as  A -> B -> C  also have selectivity between  B  and  C  but CSTRs in general are typically not chosen when the desired product is  B  as the back mixing from the CSTR favors  C . Typically a batch reactor or PFR is chosen for these reactions.

Applications 

CSTRs facilitate rapid dilution of reagents through mixing. Therefore, for non-zero-order reactions, the low concentration of reagent in the reactor means a CSTR will be less efficient at removing the reagent compared to a PFR with the same residence time. Therefore, CSTRs are typically larger than PFRs, which may be a challenge in applications where space is limited. However, one of the added benefits of dilution in CSTRs is the ability to neutralize shocks to the system. As opposed to PFRs, the performance of CSTRs is less susceptible to changes in the influent composition, which makes it ideal for a variety of industrial applications:

Environmental engineering

 Activated sludge process for wastewater treatment
 Lagoon treatment systems for natural wastewater treatment
 Anaerobic digesters for the stabilization of wastewater biosolids
 Treatment wetlands for wastewater and storm water runoff

Chemical engineering

 Loop reactor for production of pharmaceuticals

 Fermentation
 Biogas production

See also 
Laminar flow reactor
Microreactor
Oscillatory baffled reactor
Plug flow reactor model

Notes

References

Chemical reactors